Amédée-Ernest Bollée (11 January 1844 – 20 January 1917) was a French bellfounder and inventor who specialized in steam cars. After 1867 he was known as "Amédée père" to distinguish him from his similarly named son, Amédée-Ernest-Marie Bollée (1867–1926).

Biography
Bollée was the eldest son of Ernest-Sylvain Bollée, a bellfounder and inventor who moved to Le Mans in 1842. He became seriously ill in the 1860s and was obliged to delegate the day-to-day running of his businesses to his three sons. Amédée-Ernest was given charge of the bell foundry, while Ernest-Jules (1846–1922) supervised the hydraulic ram business and the youngest son, Auguste-Sylvain Bollée (1847–1906) assumed control of the Éolienne Bollée wind-turbine factory.

Steam vehicles

L'Obéissante

Amédée père manufactured his first steam vehicle L'Obéissante (The Obedient) in 1873 and made the first road trip between Paris and Le Mans in 18 hours. It was driven by two V twin steam engines, one for each rear wheel. The original vehicle is preserved in the collection of the Conservatoire National des Arts et Métiers in Paris.

La Mancelle

In 1878 Amédée père designed La Mancelle, which is regarded as the first automobile to be put into series production, 50 being manufactured in all. It possessed such (for the period) advanced features as rear-wheel drive (via shaft to the differential and then via chain to the rear wheels) and independent suspension on all four wheels. The original vehicle is preserved in the collection of the Musée de l'Automobile de la Sarthe.

La Marie-Anne

The public demonstrations of L'Obeissante and La Mancelle had secured orders for the Bollée factory, and Amédée père accepted an order for a road train which was completed in 1879. Developing 100 hp, La Marie-Anne had a three speed gearbox and was capable of towing 35 tons on a 6% slope.

La Marie-Anne was of a similar design to La Mancelle with a vertical boiler mounted at the rear driving front mounted engines which transmitted their power to the rear wheels via driveshafts and chains. A tender carried coal and water reserves.

La Nouvelle

Amédée père had derived from La Mancelle different vehicles that he delivered in a variety of styles of bodywork such as: limousine, coach, omnibus etc. The La Nouvelle was from this series and was completed in 1880. The rear of the vehicle was designed to receive the piston engine, this time rejected near the boiler in order to enlarge the passenger cabin.

La Rapide

La Rapide grouped the boiler, the engine and the controls at the front of the vehicle, thus making it possible for it to be driven by a single operator.

See also
History of steam road vehicles

References

External links
The Bollée family
In French:
La Obeissante 1873
La Mancelle 1878
La Marie-Anne 1879
La Nouvelle 1880
La Rapide 1881

1844 births
1870s cars
1880s cars
1917 deaths
19th-century French inventors
Carillon makers
Defunct motor vehicle manufacturers of France
Foundrymen
People from Le Mans
Steam road vehicles